Mazouna is a town and commune in Relizane Province, Algeria. It was once the capital of the Ottomans' western province. It is known for its vintage mosque, Elzawya, which played the role of a well-respected school for teaching the Quran.

References

Communes of Relizane Province
Algeria
Cities in Algeria